Ronald Keith Moore (born June 16, 1962) is an American former professional basketball player. He played in the National Basketball Association (NBA) for the Detroit Pistons and Phoenix Suns during the 1987–88 season. Moore also played in the Continental Basketball Association, United States Basketball League, and various professional leagues in France, Argentina, and Cyprus. He served as player-assistant coach for the Westchester Kings in 1997.

References

1962 births
Living people
American expatriate basketball people in Argentina
American expatriate basketball people in Cyprus
American expatriate basketball people in France
American men's basketball players
Atenas basketball players
Basketball players from Arkansas
Basketball players from New York City
Centers (basketball)
Detroit Pistons players
Keravnos B.C. players
New York Knicks draft picks
Oklahoma City Cavalry players
Omaha Racers players
Phoenix Suns players
Rockford Lightning players
Salem Tigers men's basketball players
West Virginia State Yellow Jackets men's basketball players
United States Basketball League coaches